Anthony Palmer was an English recipient of the Victoria Cross.

Anthony or Tony Palmer may also refer to:

 Anthony Palmer (British Army officer) (born 1949), Deputy Chief of the Defence Staff
 Tony Palmer (born 1941), British film director and author
 Tony Palmer (American football) (born 1983), American football guard
 Tony Palmer (bishop) (1966–2014), British-born South African bishop 
 Tony Palmer (cyclist) (born 1966), American former cyclist